Police Staff College, the apex training institution for the senior Police officers of Bangladesh Police, was established in 2000 and becomes a statutory organization under Police Staff College Act, 2002. The college is a centre for research studies on police subjects and shares ideas and experiences with similar institutions in and outside the country.

Location 

Background 
In late 1980s, the Police Commission (1977) recommended the establishment of a Staff College for professional training of senior police officers. After a decade, another Police Commission Report of 1988-89 underscored the importance of a liberal education for senior Police officers. In pursuance of those reports a formal proposal was sent to the government in 1994 and approval of the government came on 14 December 1998.

Activities 
Civil servants, academics and professionals from various fields come to share their thoughts, experiences and ideas with the participants.

The college has a library with books, journals, periodicals and research reports for the benefit of participants, researchers and directing staffs of the college.

Courses
Courses are offered to:
ASP
Sr. ASP
Addl. SP
SP
Addl. DIG
DIG
Class-1 officers from Armed Forces, Special Security Force (SSF), National Security Intelligence (NSI) and from other sister organizations under Ministry of Home Affairs i.e. Correction officers, Border Guard Bangladesh (BGB) officers, Fire Service and Civil Defense officers, Department of Narcotics Control (DNC) officers etc.

Management 
A Rector of the rank of Additional Inspector General of Police heads the college. Two Directors equivalent to the rank of Superintendent of Police, three Additional Superintendent of Police, one Senior Assistant Superintendent of Police and one Assistant Superintendent of Police assist him. A Board of Governors headed by the Honorable Home Minister guides the College management.

References 

Law enforcement in Bangladesh
Police academies in Bangladesh